David Grimán (born March 10, 1967 in Los Teques) is a former Venezuelan professional boxer. He is a former World Boxing Association (WBA) flyweight (112 lb) champion.

Amateur highlights 
1986 — Bronze Medalist at the Goodwill Games in the Men's Flyweight
Defeated Joe Lawlor (Ireland) 5:0
Defeated Lernik Papyan (Soviet Union) 4:1
Lost to Arthur Johnson (United States) 2:3
1986 — Silver Medalist at the World Championships in Reno, United States in the Men's Flyweight
Defeated Jean Severino (France), 5:0
Defeated Wolfgang Kamm (West Germany), 5:0
Defeated Eyüp Can (Turkey), 3:2
Lost to Pedro Orlando Reyes (Cuba), 0:5
1987 — Silver Medalist at the Pan American Games in the Men's Flyweight
Defeated Luis Ramírez (Dominican Republic), 5:0
Defeated Luis Vargas (Panama), 5:0
Defeated Rafael Ramos (Puerto Rico), 5:0
Lost to Adalberto Regalado (Cuba), 0:5
1988 — Represented Venezuela at the Olympic Games in the Men's Flyweight
Lost to Serafim Todorov (Bulgaria) points

Professional career 
Grimán turned professional in 1989 and captured the WBA flyweight title in 1992 with a decision win over Aquiles Guzmán. He defended it twice before losing to Saen Sor Ploenchit by Unanimous decision in 1994.

See also 
 List of flyweight boxing champions
 List of Venezuelans

External links 
 

1967 births
Living people
People from Los Teques
Flyweight boxers
Super-flyweight boxers
World flyweight boxing champions
World Boxing Association champions
Boxers at the 1987 Pan American Games
Pan American Games silver medalists for Venezuela
Boxers at the 1988 Summer Olympics
Olympic boxers of Venezuela
Venezuelan male boxers
Pan American Games medalists in boxing
AIBA World Boxing Championships medalists
Goodwill Games medalists in boxing
Competitors at the 1986 Goodwill Games
Medalists at the 1987 Pan American Games
20th-century Venezuelan people
21st-century Venezuelan people